Ludwig Katzenellenbogen (born 21 February 1877 in Krotoschin, German Empire; died 30 May 1944 in Berlin) was a German brewery director deported by the Nazis to  the Sachsenhausen concentration camp

Life 
His father Adolph Katzenellenbogen (1834-1903) founded the alcohol distillery in what was then Krotoschin (now Krotoszyn). In 1903, Ludwig became head of his father's business and founded the Spiritus headquarters in Berlin (later nationalized).

At the end of 1924, a consortium under his leadership acquired a large block of shares in Mitteldeutsche Creditbank, in which his cousin Albert (1863-after 1933) sat on the board. After the death of Adolf Jarislowsky's son Alfred (1929), the way was clear for the merger with Commerzbank. He became general manager of the Ostwerke-Schultheiß-Patzenhofer brewery in Berlin. Ostwerke was a group of spirit, cement, yeast, glass and machine factories and ran into difficulties after the takeover of Schultheiß-Patzenhofer-Brauerei and as a result of the economic crisis at the end of the 1920s.

Until 1930 he was married to Estella Marcuse (1886-1991), the daughter of a physician. Their children were the political scientist Konrad Kellen (1913-2007) and younger sisters Estella and Leonie. They lived in the Freienhagen manor house  outside Liebenwalde north of Berlin 

In 1930 Katzenellenbogen married the actress Tilla Durieux  and helped her to finance the Piscatorbühne (Piscator Theatre) at Berlin’s Nollendorfplatz.

Art collection 
Katzenellenbogen has an important art collection which included "Rehe" Dammwild Roes, "Bacchant“ by Lovis Corinth, a self portrait by Oskar Kokoschka, "Chemin de Plaine avec une porte de jardin a droite" by Pissarro, as well as many other works.

Nazi persecution 
When the Nazis came to power, the couple fled with two suitcases and 200 marks.  In 1933 he fled with Tilla Durieux first to Ascona in Switzerland and emigrated from there in 1935 to Zagreb (Kingdom of Yugoslavia), where a distant relative of his wife lived. While she was trying to obtain a visa in Belgrade for both of them to emigrate to the USA, she was surprised by the German bombing and raid on Belgrade in April 1941 and was thus separated from her husband.. Katzenellenbogen was arrested by the Gestapo in Saloniki in 1941 and deported to the Sachsenhausen concentration camp north of Berlin. He died in 1944 in the Jewish Hospital Berlin.

Postwar search for Nazi-looted art 
The heirs of Ludwig and Estella Katzenellenbogen have listed fifty artworks with the German Lost Art Foundation.

Commemoration 

In Liebenwalde, commemorative stumbling blocks were laid for Ludwig Katzenellenbogen and other family members by the artist Gunter Demnig.

Literature 

 Joseph Walk (Hrsg.): Kurzbiographien zur Geschichte der Juden 1918–1945. Hrsg. vom Leo Baeck Institute, Jerusalem. Saur, München 1988, ISBN 3-598-10477-4.
 Tilla Durieux: Meine ersten neunzig Jahre. Herbig, München 1971 (dort meist L. K. genannt)
 Katzenellenbogen, Ludwig, in: Werner Röder, Herbert A. Strauss (Hrsg.): Biographisches Handbuch der deutschsprachigen Emigration nach 1933. Band 1: Politik, Wirtschaft, Öffentliches Leben. München : Saur, 1980, S. 354

References

External links 

 Ludwig Katzenellenbogen - Odysseus in Freienhagen, von Hermann Aurich. (Kurze Biographie)
 Zeitungsartikel über Ludwig Katzenellenbogen in der Pressemappe 20. Jahrhundert der ZBW – Leibniz-Informationszentrum Wirtschaft.

1877 births
1944 deaths
Emigrants from Nazi Germany
Businesspeople from Berlin
20th-century businesspeople
German Jews who died in the Holocaust
Sachsenhausen concentration camp prisoners